The Lost House is a lost 1915 American short drama film directed by  Christy Cabanne and starring Lillian Gish.

Cast
 Lillian Gish as Dosia Dale
 Wallace Reid as Ford
 F. A. Turner as Dosia's uncle
 Elmer Clifton as Cuthbert
 Allan Sears as Dr. Protheroe (as A.D. Sears)

See also
 Lillian Gish filmography
 Wallace Reid Filmography

References

External links

1915 films
1915 lost films
1915 short films
1915 drama films
American silent feature films
Silent American drama films
American black-and-white films
Films directed by Christy Cabanne
Films with screenplays by Anita Loos
Films based on short fiction
Lost American films
1910s American films